Wusasa is a town just outside the major city of Zaria in Kaduna State in Northern Nigeria.

Activities of the colonial missionaries in the ancient city of Zaria forced the royal dynasty of Zaria to request them to move outside the city's ancient walls. The missionaries were given the liberty to select any place of their choice for the continuation of their activities. 
One of the reasons which informed the decision of the royal family to move the activities of the missionaries outside the city was the conversion of many residents of the Zaria city, including some members of the ruling class, to Christianity. The rulers, then, who were earlier reluctant in relocating the missionaries, found their activities intolerable when some members of the royal family began to accept Christ as their redeemer.
This was why Dr. Miller, the head of the missionaries’ team, was asked to go anywhere outside Zaria city to find a convenient place to relocate his school. The missionaries had already built a school and a hospital in the city. Dr. Miller's school was becoming popular with each passing day. 
The need for space for the expansion of the Miller's school was another reason which forced the movement. 
When colonial explorers came to Zaria, they first settled in Babban Dodo inside the ancient city. Dr. Miller, who was given the liberty to choose a new settlement, opted for the present Wusasa and the Emir did not hesitate to give him the land to use on loan for 60 years.

Before Dr. Miller found Wusasa area, which was then known as Wusa-Wusa, he had visited many places. The head of the missionaries was attracted by the Wusa-Wusa rock. He was said to have met some Wusa-Wusa indigenous hunters who took him round the land. After Dr. Miller had found the area suitable for his activities, the white man, who couldn't pronounce the name Wusa-Wusa, changed the name to his convenience, which is Wusasa. After his royal highness, the then emir of Zazzau Kwasau, and later Sarki Ibrahim, had given them the permission to relocate to Wusasa, the missionaries with some of the Hausa-Fulani early Christians, settled in the area and continued with their evangelism. They built a Church, hospital and school in 1929. The Church is still in the shape the missionary built it in 1929. It is only the roofing that was modified to zinc instead of its original thatch and mud.

Some parts of St. Luke's Anglican Hospital, the second prominent hospital in Zaria after ABUTH, are still maintaining their original shape as built in 1929 by the missionaries. The first clay building of the hospital, which consists of three rooms, had however collapsed. The hospital management had continued to retain the relics of the building despite the various expansion and development which took place in the hospital.

The coming of Christianity to Zaria and the subsequent founding of Wusasa had its root when in the year 1899; a group of Christian missionaries from Britain came to the Hausaland of Nigeria to establish Christianity. The group of five; Bishop Jugwell, the leader, Dr. Miller, Mr. Burgin, Rev. Dudley Rider and Rev. Richardson came to Nigeria after learning the Hausa language at Tripoli, capital city of Libya, from the Nigerian Hausa pilgrims who usually had a stop-over amidst their foot journey to Mecca.

The team of missionaries journeyed from Lagos to Kano. In Kano, the missionaries were turned back by the then authorities. In 1902, the emir of Zazzau Aliyu Kwasau allowed the missionaries to settle in Zaria city. He assigned two locations to them within the city; one was at Durumin Mai-Garke - Babban Dodo - and the other at Kofar Kuyanbana.

Dr. Miller became the ordained reverend Minister of the Church. He was ordained in 1922. Dr Miller in conjunction with J.T Umar and P.A Yusufu translated the Holy Bible to Hausa for the benefit of their evangelism of Hausaland and the Zaria area in particular. This historic trend made Wusasa the way it is now where in the same household one can find Muslims and Christians living together as brothers and sisters. 
Wusasa residents don't discriminate. Apart from attending their different Churches and Mosques, they almost do everything together, celebrate each other's festivities like Sallah and Christmas, attend to each other's naming or wedding ceremonies and mourn together in the event of death or any tragedy. Sometimes a Muslim even marries from a Christian family.

The resistance of some original  indigenes of Wusasa to accept Christianity is the reason behind the presence of Muslims in Wusasa today, any Christian there that is not Hausa-Fulani came from outside to settle there. The original people, apart from the indigenes, who settled here along with the missionaries, were Hausa-Fulani.

All the Chiefs of Wusasa are reporting to the emir of Zazzau. 
Wusasa has produced many intelligent elites that gave the northern part of the country its place of pride.

The first Northern Nigerian medical doctor, I. B. Dikko, was trained in Wusasa. Late Professor Ishaya Audu, Malam Zakari, late Malam John Tafida, Rhoda Mohammed, the first woman Nigeria's ambassador to United Nations, General Yakubu Gowon, former head of state and quite a number of other prominent Nigerians have their roots at Wusasa. Apart from technocrats, Wusasa had produced veteran journalists like the late James Audu, musicians like the late Bala Miller and academicians like Professor Adamu Biki.

Notable people
R. A. B. Dikko
Darius Ishaku

References

External links 
 Maplandia map (via Google maps)
 The Church at Wusasa (via KTravula.com)

Populated places in Kaduna State
Zaria